Dana P. Rowe is an American musical theater composer whose works have been performed internationally with productions in London’s West End (Theatre Royal Drury Lane, Prince of Wales, The Donmar Warehouse), Russia, Czech Republic, Japan (including Tokyo’s Imperial Garden Theatre), Germany, Australia, New York City, São Paulo, Brazil and Slovenia.

Much of his work has been written with lyricist John Dempsey.  With Dempsey, he wrote the music for Zombie Prom (1995), The Fix (directed by Sam Mendes, 1997), and the stage adaptation of John Updike's The Witches of Eastwick (2000).  Rowe and Dempsey were nominated for the Olivier Award for The Fix and The Witches of Eastwick, both of which were produced in London by Cameron Mackintosh.

Rowe also composed the score for The Ballad of Bonnie and Clyde, a musical based on the famous bank-robbing couple, with book and lyrics by Michael Aman and Oscar E. Moore.  The Ballad of Bonnie and Clyde was a featured production at the 2005 New York Musical Theatre Festival.

In 2011, he collaborated with Maribeth Graham on See Jane Run!, which had its premiere at the Actors' Playhouse in Miami.

From March to April 2012, Rowe and Dempsey's new musical, Brother Russia, premiered at the Signature Theatre. The show is described as, "In a desolate potato field north of Omsk, a comically fourth-rate Russian theatre troupe sets up its tents and wows the local farmers with rock-fueled adaptations of Tolstoy and Dostoevsky. Tonight, however, the company will toss classic literature aside to showcase the life story of their impresario and star, the seemingly immortal Brother Russia – more commonly known as Grigori Yefimovich Rasputin. Yes, that Rasputin: the hypnotic mystic who seduced and ruled the Tsar and Tsarina in the waning days of Imperial Russia."

He also provides coaching for artists on his website in an attempt to "help performers, writers, coaches, and creative artists worldwide achieve greater career success..." pointing out that there are "over 340,000 performing artists in the US alone" with the majority receiving poor salaries.

References

External links
 
 
 
 

American musical theatre composers
Living people
Year of birth missing (living people)